USS LST-374 was one of over 1,000 tank landing ships (LSTs) built for the United States Navy during World War II.

Laid down on 12 November 1942 at Quincy, Massachusetts, by the Bethlehem Steel Company; launched on 19 January 1943; sponsored by Mrs. Victor D. Herbster; and commissioned on 29 January 1943.

Service history
During World War II, LST-374 participated in the Allied invasion of Sicily in July and August 1943 and the invasion of Normandy in June 1944.

Decommissioned 29 May 1945 at Baltimore, Maryland, the ship was redesignated USS Minerva (ARL-47) 29 May 1945. Conversion to a landing craft repair ship commenced on 30 May 1945 at the Maryland Drydock Company of Baltimore; the conversion was subsequently canceled 11 September 1945 and the ship reverted to LST-374. Struck from the Naval Vessel Register 12 March 1946, the tank landing ship was sold to A. G. Schoonmaker for conversion to merchant service 14 January 1947.

LST-374 earned two battle stars for World War II service.

See also
 List of United States Navy LSTs

References

 
 

World War II amphibious warfare vessels of the United States
Ships built in Quincy, Massachusetts
1943 ships
LST-1-class tank landing ships of the United States Navy